Cristina Grigoraș (born 25 April 1990  in Huși) is a Romanian rower. She finished 4th in the eight at the 2012 Summer Olympics.

Junior career
Grigoraş was part of the Romanian junior women's eight who won the 2007 Junior World Championship.  She won the silver medal at the 2008 Junior World Championship in the junior women's pair with Andreea Boghian.  She also won bronze as part of the Romanian women's quadruple sculls team at the 2010 World U-23 Championship.  Grigoraş and Boghian won silver in the women's pair at the 2011 World U-23 Championship.

Senior career
Grigoraş was part of the women's eight that won gold at the 2012 European Championships, and won the women's pair with Boghian.  In 2013, Grigoraş and Boghian won the gold medal in the women's pair.  That year Grigoraş was part of the Romanian women's eight team that won silver at the World Championships.

In 2014 Grigoraş and Laura Oprea won the silver medal in the women's pair at the European Championships.  A year later, the team won the bronze medal at the European Championships.

References

External links
 
 
 
 

1990 births
Living people
People from Huși
Romanian female rowers
Rowers at the 2012 Summer Olympics
Olympic rowers of Romania
World Rowing Championships medalists for Romania
European Rowing Championships medalists